Aethalopteryx simillima is a moth in the family Cossidae. It is found in Somalia and Ethiopia.

References

Moths described in 1916
Aethalopteryx